Moore Island is an uninhabited island in Qikiqtaaluk Region, Nunavut, Canada. It is a member of the Hopewell Islands group in Hudson Bay. It measures about  along its longest axis.

References

Islands of Hudson Bay
Uninhabited islands of Qikiqtaaluk Region